Leonardo Fernandes (born 23 December 1991) is a Brazilian professional footballer who plays as a midfielder for the Tampa Bay Rowdies in the United Soccer League.

Early life
Fernandes was born in São Paulo but raised in North Babylon, New York, and played at Stony Brook University from 2009 to 2012. In his senior season at Stony Brook, the left-footed Fernandes started all 18 matches and led his team in goals (9) and assists (7). He was selected to the 2012 All-America East first team and named America East Midfielder of the Year for the third consecutive season. Fernandes left Stony Brook as the team's all-time leader in points scored.

Career

Philadelphia Union
On 22 January 2013, Fernandes was selected as the 62nd overall pick in the 2013 MLS Supplemental Draft by Philadelphia Union. He signed with the club on 1 March 2013. Serving mostly as a reserve role for the Union for his first season, Fernandes began to break into the starting line-up during the 2014 season, scoring twice.

Harrisburg City Islanders
For the 2013 and 2014 seasons, Fernandes spent temporary stints being loaned to Philadelphia's former USL affiliate, Harrisburg City Islanders, making five appearances for the club and scoring once.

New York Cosmos
For the 2015 season, the Union sent Fernandes out on loan to experience regular minutes throughout the season. In January 2015, he signed a year long loan deal with the New York Cosmos. The loan move proved successful as Fernandes became a regular starter for the Cosmos, who would go on to win the 2015 NASL Championship. Through the season he scored a career high ten goals across all competitions. His efforts were recognized, winning the 2015 NASL Young Player of the Year Award.

Bethlehem Steel FC
The formation of Bethlehem Steel FC prompted the Union to have Fernandes return to the Philadelphia organization. He would become a regular starter for Steel FC with intermittent appearances for the first team. Fernandes finished the season with fourteen appearances and scoring once.

Tampa Bay Rowdies
Fernandes signed with USL Championship club Tampa Bay Rowdies in 2017. On 14 July 2022, Fernandes was named USL Championship Player of the Month for June 2022 after scoring five goals throughout the month.

In February 2023, Fernandes ruptured his Achilles tendon during a preseason game. The Rowdies announced on 3 March 2023 that he would miss the 2023 USL Championship season.

Career statistics

Club

Updated 26 October 2016

Honors

New York Cosmos
North American Soccer League Supporters' Trophy: 2015
North American Soccer League Soccer Bowl: 2015

Individual
North American Soccer League Young Player of the Year: 2015

Tampa Bay Rowdies

Individual
USL Championship Most Valuable Player: 2022

References

External links
 
 Cosmos player profile

1991 births
Living people
American soccer players
Association football midfielders
Philadelphia Union II players
Brooklyn Knights players
Major League Soccer players
New York Cosmos (2010) players
North American Soccer League players
Penn FC players
People from North Babylon, New York
Philadelphia Union draft picks
Philadelphia Union players
Reading United A.C. players
Soccer players from New York (state)
Sportspeople from Suffolk County, New York
Stony Brook Seawolves men's soccer players
Tampa Bay Rowdies players
USL Championship players
USL League Two players